Imogen Carpenter (1912–1993) was a mid-20th century American actress, musician, composer and music lecturer.

In 1926 at age 14, she moved from her native Arkansas to Chicago to attend the Chicago Musical College and later the Boguslawski School of Music. She worked first as a concert pianist and later as a singer and pianist in night clubs, theaters, and on radio.

She appeared in the Broadway musicals Ziegfeld Follies of 1941 and Cole Porter's Mexican Hayride. Collaborating with songwriters Lenny Adelson, Kim Gannon, and others, she produced several popular song compositions.

Works
"Anytime, Anywhere" (Imogen Carpenter, Lenny Adelson) on Frank Sinatra's Look to Your Heart album and Seth MacFarlane's Music Is Better Than Words album
"She Always Knows" (Imogen Carpenter, Lenny Adelson) on Sammy Davis, Jr.'s Here's Lookin' at You album
"Born to Sing the Blues" (Lenny Adelson, Imogen Carpenter) on Shirley Bassey's Born to Sing the Blues album

Personal
Carpenter married movie producer Milton Feldman, who was born July 19, 1911 in New York City and died October 8, 1976 in Woodland Hills, Los Angeles, California; they had two children.

During World War 2, Carpenter dated U.S. Naval Commander Frederick J. Becton, captain of the destroyer USS Laffey (DD-724), which successfully withstood a Japanese kamikaze attack during the Battle of Okinawa.

References

1912 births
1993 deaths
Actors from Hot Springs, Arkansas
Actresses from Arkansas
American stage actresses
Chicago Musical College alumni
20th-century American actresses
Musicians from Hot Springs, Arkansas